Amaranthe is a Swedish metal band originally known as Avalanche. The band is notable for their blend of various metal genres and having three lead vocalists.

History  

Formed by Olof Mörck (Dragonland, Nightrage) and Joacim "Jake E" Lundberg (Dreamland, Dream Evil) in 2008, the project began taking shape when singers Elize Ryd (toured with Kamelot) and Andreas Solveström (Cipher System, Within Y) signed on, as did drummer Morten Løwe Sørensen (The Cleansing, Koldborn, Mercenary). Bassist Johan Andreassen (Engel) joined after the photoshoot for the Leave Everything Behind demo but before the recording of the first album Amaranthe. The band was originally called Avalanche until May 2009, when they were forced to change their name due to legal issues. The members chose to rename the band Amaranthe. They later released their first demo, Leave Everything Behind.

The band's debut album, Amaranthe, was released in April 2011 and reached a peak position of 35th on Swedish charts and 16th on Finnish Charts. Their second album, The Nexus, was released in March 2013. Guitarist Olof Mörck described the album as having greater contrasts, a more controversial mix of genres, and featuring more creative freedoms than Amaranthe. According to Olof, the band "took everything [up] to eleven" in the new album. The album reached 6th on Swedish charts, 4th on Finnish charts, and reached a peak of 12th on the US Heatseekers charts.

In October 2013, harsh vocalist Solveström left the band and was replaced by Henrik Englund Wilhelmsson (Scarpoint). Their third album, Massive Addictive, was released on 21 October 2014. A special compilation Breaking Point - B-sides 2011-2015 was released on 30 October 2015. It consists of b-sides and bonus tracks from Amaranthe's career. Their fourth album, Maximalism, was released on 21 October 2016.

In November 2016, male clean vocalist Jake E announced that he would take a break from the band. In February 2017, the band confirmed that he was permanently leaving. In March 2017, he joined CyHra. In July 2017, Amaranthe stated on their Facebook page that Nils Molin of Dynazty would join the band as their permanent vocalist, after filling in for Jake E on tour dates.

On 10 August 2018, they released their new single, "365", from their new album Helix, which itself was released on 19 October. At that time, they wrote and performed the credits theme song to the 12 oz. Mouse special "INVICTUS".

On 16 October 2019, they announced that they had signed with Nuclear Blast Records.

On 3 January 2020, the band released their rendition of Sabaton's "82nd All the Way", originally taken from Sabaton's 2019 studio album The Great War.

On 13 February 2020, the band released the single "Do or Die", which features former Arch Enemy-vocalist Angela Gossow on growling vocals and Arch Enemy-guitarist Jeff Loomis on the guitar solo. The official music video, which was filmed in Spain, was released the next day. In the music video's description, the band's label Nuclear Blast announced that their sixth studio album would be released in September 2020.

On 5 March 2020, the band released the music video for "Endlessly", originally from the album Maximalism. The video was directed, filmed and edited by Duminciuc Bogdan and is actually the documentation of the Transylvanian wedding between guitarist Olof Mörck and his wife Cătălina Popa (the flutist from the German symphonic metal band Haggard), which took place on 19 July 2019 at Sungarden, Cluj-Napoca, Romania.

Amaranthe released their sixth studio album, titled Manifest, on 2 October 2020. The first single 'Viral' was released on 26 June 2020, followed by a second single, 'Strong,' on 14 August 2020, and 'Archangel' as the third single on 18 September 2020.

In December 2021, Amaranthe released a single called "PvP". The track was written as the official anthem for the Swedish E-Sports world cup team at the E-Sports world championship. The single was accompanied by a music video and a Browser game, hosted on the band's website.

On 8 June 2022, Wilhelmsson announced his exit from the band, saying that he wished to spend more time with his family and began to dislike touring over the years. He also said that he was planning on releasing solo material in the near future. The band announced they would be joined by two special guests as his replacements at their summer shows of that year.

Musical style 

Even as their body of work grows, where exactly Amaranthe's music fits into the heavy metal sphere remains notoriously undefined. Band members, websites, and critics have referred to the band and their albums as various different genres such as pop metal, melodic death metal, metalcore, power metal, symphonic metal, death metal, heavy metal, and alternative metal.

Band members 
Current members
 Olof Mörck – guitars, keyboards, synthesizers (2008–present), bass (2008–2009)
 Elize Ryd – female clean vocals (2008–present)
 Morten Løwe Sørensen – drums (2008–present)
 Johan Andreassen – bass (2010–present)
 Nils Molin – male clean vocals (2017–present)

Current touring members
 Richard Sjunnesson – harsh vocals (2022–present)

Former members
 Andreas Solveström – harsh vocals (2008–2013)
 Joacim "Jake E" Lundberg – male clean vocals (2008–2017)
 Henrik "GG6" Englund Wilhelmsson –  harsh vocals (2013–2022)

Former touring members
 Chris Adam Hedman Sörbye – clean vocals (2016–2017)
 Samy Elbanna – harsh vocals (2022)
 Olle Ekman - harsh vocals (2015)

Timeline

Discography

 Amaranthe (2011)
 The Nexus (2013)
 Massive Addictive (2014)
 Maximalism (2016)
 Helix (2018)
 Manifest (2020)

References

External links

 

2009 establishments in Sweden
Swedish melodic death metal musical groups
Swedish metalcore musical groups
Swedish power metal musical groups
Musical groups established in 2009
Musical groups from Gothenburg